The 1938 Cork Intermediate Football Championship was the 29th staging of the Cork Intermediate Football Championship since its establishment by the Cork County Board in 1909. The draw for the opening round fixtures took place on 30 January 1938. The championship ran from 12 June to 9 October 1938.

The final was played on 9 October 1938 at the Castle Grounds in Macroom, between Bantry Blues and Dohenys, in what was their first meeting in the final in two years. Bantry Blues won the match by 1-01 to 0-02 to claim their fourth championship title overall, a first title in two years and a third title in five seasons.

Results

First round

 Dohenys received a bye in this round.

Semi-final

 Bantry Blues received a bye in this round.

Final

References

Cork Intermediate Football Championship